The Feldberg Foundation promotes scientific exchange between German and British scientists in the field of experimental medical research. The foundation is registered in Hamburg, Germany with the secretariat based in the UK.

The pharmacologist Wilhelm Feldberg, who as a Jew had been forced to emigrate from Germany in 1933, used the pension he was given as Emeritus Professor in Germany and the restitution money that he received from the German Government to establish the Feldberg Foundation in 1961.

Each year a German and a British scientist are chosen, and each recipient gives a prize lecture in the other one's country.

Recipients

2011–

2001–2010

1991–2000

1981–1990

1971–1980

1961–1970

External links 
Official Web Site

Academic awards